Bhinay is a town in Bhinay Tehsil in Ajmer district of Rajasthan State, India. It is located in Ajmer Division.Bhinay was originally ruled by the Bhil kings, the last Bhil king was Mandaliya Bhil.

References

Cities and towns in Ajmer district